Niall Dunne (born 30 November 1974) is the Chief Executive Officer of Polymateria, a British business developing a new standard in biodegradable and compostable plastics to combat plastic pollution. Upon his appointment, Niall announced his ambition to “redesign the rules of an entire industry” and become the "Tesla" of plastics.

Career
For three years, Dunne was Managing Director in Europe, the Middle East and Africa (EMEA) at Saatchi & Saatchi, a consulting and communications agency, where he led sustainability practices. In 2000 Dunne joined Accenture as an executive where he helped establish the company's climate change and sustainability practice. Dunne has written and spoken about the power of communications to tackle major social, environmental and economic problems.

BT
Niall was appointed Chief Sustainability Officer of the BT Group in 2011 where he was responsible for ensuring green practices in the company’s strategy, products and services.

In order to reduce BT’s dependency on fossil fuels, he launched a partnership with renewable energy utility, Good Energy, which offered customers discounted tariffs to increase uptake of a full-renewable energy supply.

During Niall’s tenure BT achieved its target to reduce carbon emissions by 80% four years early. In support of the Paris Agreement to limit global warming by 1.5C, BT increased its commitment to an 87% emissions reduction by 2030 working as part of the Science Based Targets initiative (SBTi).

In 2017, BT announced the phase-out of diesel and petrol-only vehicles in its fleet of almost 30,000, one of the largest fleets in the UK.

World Economic Forum
During 2012, the World Economic Forum (WEF) inducted Niall into the Forum of Young Global Leaders. In the WEF announcement, he was quoted as saying: “Becoming part of it is humbling yet thrilling as it is networks like this and our innate ability to get organised and innovate that will create the systemic change necessary to sustain and empower every man woman and child on the planet.” He continues to support WEF with insight on sustainability for growth.

Niall was vice chair of the WEF's Global Agenda Council on Sustainable Consumption 2012-14 and joined the WEF Global Agenda Council on Climate Change in 2014.

Polymateria
Since January 2018, Niall is Chief Executive Officer at Polymateria, a British technology company which develops biodegradable and compostable solutions to tackle plastic pollution.

Jointly developed with and based at Imperial College London, the company claims its proprietary formulation called Biotransformation is time-controlled to break down commonly-littered forms of plastic such as polyethylene (PE) and polypropylene (PP) without creating microplastics or causing harm to nature.

In 2020, Polymateria became the first company in the world to fully biodegrade the most commonly-littered forms of plastic packaging in less than a year in real-world conditions without creating microplastics. In the same year the company raised £15 million in new funding.

Other interests
Noted in 2012 by Business Green editor James Murray as being "one of the UK's most high profile and influential sustainability executives".  The Guardian Sustainable Business blog named Niall as one of the top sustainability executives and sources of sustainable news and comment on Twitter.

The day after the People's Climate March in September 2014, Niall spoke at the Social Good Summit in New York City about the need for a move from "conspicuous consumption to a much more conscientious, much more collaborative model for consumption.".

Niall is a Non-Executive Director of Collectively, the digital media platform launched in October 2014 to inspire and empower people to live more sustainable lives. A non-profit company formed through a collaboration of over 30 global businesses and international Non-governmental organizations.

A keen athlete since his youth, Niall represented Ireland internationally as an 800m runner, and urged sports fans to switch to renewable energy.

References

External links
 
 
 

British Telecom people
Living people
1974 births